The Pitticow River is a river in the north of the Unorganized Part of Kenora District in Northwestern Ontario, Canada. It is in the Hudson Bay drainage basin and is a right tributary of the Fawn River. The Pitticow River can be used to cross between the Severn River/ Fawn River drainage basin to the Winisk River drainage basin, the next major basin to the east.

See also
List of rivers of Ontario

References

Sources

Rivers of Kenora District
Tributaries of Hudson Bay